The 2001–02 Washington Capitals season was the team's 28th season of play. The team finished second in the Southeast, but ninth overall in the Eastern Conference to miss the playoffs.

Off-season
On September 27, Steve Konowalchuk and Brendan Witt were named co-captains.

Regular season
The Caps tied the New Jersey Devils for fewest short-handed goals scored, with just 2.

Final standings

Schedule and results

|- align="center" bgcolor="#CCFFCC"
|1||W||October 6, 2001||6–1 || align="left"|  New Jersey Devils (2001–02) ||1–0–0–0 || 
|- align="center" bgcolor="#FFBBBB"
|2||L||October 8, 2001||0–4 || align="left"| @ Boston Bruins (2001–02) ||1–1–0–0 || 
|- align="center" bgcolor="#CCFFCC"
|3||W||October 10, 2001||5–2 || align="left"| @ New York Rangers (2001–02) ||2–1–0–0 || 
|- align="center" bgcolor="#FFBBBB"
|4||L||October 12, 2001||1–2 || align="left"| @ Mighty Ducks of Anaheim (2001–02) ||2–2–0–0 || 
|- align="center" bgcolor="#FFBBBB"
|5||L||October 13, 2001||2–5 || align="left"| @ Phoenix Coyotes (2001–02) ||2–3–0–0 || 
|- align="center" bgcolor="#CCFFCC"
|6||W||October 16, 2001||3–2 OT|| align="left"| @ Los Angeles Kings (2001–02) ||3–3–0–0 || 
|- align="center" bgcolor="#CCFFCC"
|7||W||October 19, 2001||4–1 || align="left"|  Montreal Canadiens (2001–02) ||4–3–0–0 || 
|- align="center" bgcolor="#FFBBBB"
|8||L||October 20, 2001||3–6 || align="left"| @ Philadelphia Flyers (2001–02) ||4–4–0–0 || 
|- align="center"
|9||T||October 23, 2001||1–1 OT|| align="left"| @ Tampa Bay Lightning (2001–02) ||4–4–1–0 || 
|- align="center" bgcolor="#CCFFCC"
|10||W||October 24, 2001||4–3 OT|| align="left"| @ Florida Panthers (2001–02) ||5–4–1–0 || 
|- align="center" bgcolor="#FFBBBB"
|11||L||October 26, 2001||0–1 || align="left"| @ Atlanta Thrashers (2001–02) ||5–5–1–0 || 
|- align="center" bgcolor="#FFBBBB"
|12||L||October 30, 2001||0–3 || align="left"|  Philadelphia Flyers (2001–02) ||5–6–1–0 || 
|-

|- align="center"
|13||T||November 2, 2001||2–2 OT|| align="left"|  Phoenix Coyotes (2001–02) ||5–6–2–0 || 
|- align="center" bgcolor="#FFBBBB"
|14||L||November 3, 2001||1–4 || align="left"| @ St. Louis Blues (2001–02) ||5–7–2–0 || 
|- align="center" bgcolor="#FFBBBB"
|15||L||November 6, 2001||2–4 || align="left"| @ Toronto Maple Leafs (2001–02) ||5–8–2–0 || 
|- align="center" bgcolor="#FFBBBB"
|16||L||November 8, 2001||2–3 || align="left"|  Carolina Hurricanes (2001–02) ||5–9–2–0 || 
|- align="center" bgcolor="#CCFFCC"
|17||W||November 10, 2001||3–0 || align="left"|  Atlanta Thrashers (2001–02) ||6–9–2–0 || 
|- align="center" bgcolor="#FFBBBB"
|18||L||November 13, 2001||5–11 || align="left"|  Ottawa Senators (2001–02) ||6–10–2–0 || 
|- align="center" bgcolor="#FFBBBB"
|19||L||November 15, 2001||0–5 || align="left"| @ Philadelphia Flyers (2001–02) ||6–11–2–0 || 
|- align="center" bgcolor="#CCFFCC"
|20||W||November 17, 2001||4–1 || align="left"|  Mighty Ducks of Anaheim (2001–02) ||7–11–2–0 || 
|- align="center" bgcolor="#CCFFCC"
|21||W||November 21, 2001||3–2 || align="left"|  Tampa Bay Lightning (2001–02) ||8–11–2–0 || 
|- align="center" bgcolor="#CCFFCC"
|22||W||November 23, 2001||6–2 || align="left"|  New York Rangers (2001–02) ||9–11–2–0 || 
|- align="center" bgcolor="#FFBBBB"
|23||L||November 24, 2001||3–5 || align="left"| @ Montreal Canadiens (2001–02) ||9–12–2–0 || 
|- align="center"
|24||T||November 27, 2001||5–5 OT|| align="left"| @ New York Islanders (2001–02) ||9–12–3–0 || 
|- align="center" bgcolor="#FFBBBB"
|25||L||November 28, 2001||2–5 || align="left"|  Buffalo Sabres (2001–02) ||9–13–3–0 || 
|- align="center" bgcolor="#CCFFCC"
|26||W||November 30, 2001||6–2 || align="left"|  Carolina Hurricanes (2001–02) ||10–13–3–0 || 
|-

|- align="center" bgcolor="#CCFFCC"
|27||W||December 2, 2001||4–3 OT|| align="left"| @ Carolina Hurricanes (2001–02) ||11–13–3–0 || 
|- align="center" bgcolor="#CCFFCC"
|28||W||December 4, 2001||5–2 || align="left"|  New York Rangers (2001–02) ||12–13–3–0 || 
|- align="center"
|29||T||December 6, 2001||3–3 OT|| align="left"| @ Atlanta Thrashers (2001–02) ||12–13–4–0 || 
|- align="center" bgcolor="#FFBBBB"
|30||L||December 8, 2001||1–3 || align="left"| @ New Jersey Devils (2001–02) ||12–14–4–0 || 
|- align="center"
|31||T||December 11, 2001||2–2 OT|| align="left"|  Pittsburgh Penguins (2001–02) ||12–14–5–0 || 
|- align="center" bgcolor="#CCFFCC"
|32||W||December 13, 2001||2–1 || align="left"|  Boston Bruins (2001–02) ||13–14–5–0 || 
|- align="center" bgcolor="#CCFFCC"
|33||W||December 15, 2001||5–2 || align="left"|  Atlanta Thrashers (2001–02) ||14–14–5–0 || 
|- align="center" bgcolor="#FFBBBB"
|34||L||December 19, 2001||2–5 || align="left"| @ Florida Panthers (2001–02) ||14–15–5–0 || 
|- align="center" bgcolor="#FFBBBB"
|35||L||December 21, 2001||3–4 || align="left"| @ Pittsburgh Penguins (2001–02) ||14–16–5–0 || 
|- align="center"
|36||T||December 22, 2001||4–4 OT|| align="left"|  Pittsburgh Penguins (2001–02) ||14–16–6–0 || 
|- align="center" bgcolor="#FFBBBB"
|37||L||December 26, 2001||1–4 || align="left"|  Philadelphia Flyers (2001–02) ||14–17–6–0 || 
|- align="center" bgcolor="#CCFFCC"
|38||W||December 28, 2001||3–2 OT|| align="left"| @ Dallas Stars (2001–02) ||15–17–6–0 || 
|- align="center"
|39||T||December 30, 2001||5–5 OT|| align="left"|  Carolina Hurricanes (2001–02) ||15–17–7–0 || 
|-

|- align="center" bgcolor="#CCFFCC"
|40||W||January 1, 2002||3–2 || align="left"|  New York Islanders (2001–02) ||16–17–7–0 || 
|- align="center" bgcolor="#FFBBBB"
|41||L||January 3, 2002||1–4 || align="left"| @ Ottawa Senators (2001–02) ||16–18–7–0 || 
|- align="center" bgcolor="#FFBBBB"
|42||L||January 5, 2002||4–7 || align="left"| @ Boston Bruins (2001–02) ||16–19–7–0 || 
|- align="center" bgcolor="#FFBBBB"
|43||L||January 7, 2002||1–2 || align="left"|  Florida Panthers (2001–02) ||16–20–7–0 || 
|- align="center" bgcolor="#CCFFCC"
|44||W||January 9, 2002||6–3 || align="left"|  Columbus Blue Jackets (2001–02) ||17–20–7–0 || 
|- align="center"
|45||T||January 11, 2002||3–3 OT|| align="left"|  Toronto Maple Leafs (2001–02) ||17–20–8–0 || 
|- align="center" bgcolor="#CCFFCC"
|46||W||January 12, 2002||1–0 || align="left"| @ Florida Panthers (2001–02) ||18–20–8–0 || 
|- align="center" bgcolor="#CCFFCC"
|47||W||January 14, 2002||1–0 OT|| align="left"|  Boston Bruins (2001–02) ||19–20–8–0 || 
|- align="center" bgcolor="#FFBBBB"
|48||L||January 16, 2002||0–2 || align="left"| @ Montreal Canadiens (2001–02) ||19–21–8–0 || 
|- align="center" bgcolor="#FFBBBB"
|49||L||January 18, 2002||1–3 || align="left"| @ Detroit Red Wings (2001–02) ||19–22–8–0 || 
|- align="center" bgcolor="#FFBBBB"
|50||L||January 19, 2002||1–5 || align="left"|  Vancouver Canucks (2001–02) ||19–23–8–0 || 
|- align="center" bgcolor="#CCFFCC"
|51||W||January 22, 2002||3–0 || align="left"| @ Atlanta Thrashers (2001–02) ||20–23–8–0 || 
|- align="center" bgcolor="#FFBBBB"
|52||L||January 23, 2002||3–5 || align="left"|  Montreal Canadiens (2001–02) ||20–24–8–0 || 
|- align="center" bgcolor="#FFBBBB"
|53||L||January 26, 2002||3–6 || align="left"| @ New York Rangers (2001–02) ||20–25–8–0 || 
|- align="center" bgcolor="#FF6F6F"
|54||OTL||January 27, 2002||2–3 OT|| align="left"|  Buffalo Sabres (2001–02) ||20–25–8–1 || 
|- align="center" bgcolor="#FFBBBB"
|55||L||January 30, 2002||1–4 || align="left"|  St. Louis Blues (2001–02) ||20–26–8–1 || 
|-

|- align="center" bgcolor="#CCFFCC"
|56||W||February 6, 2002||2–1 || align="left"|  Minnesota Wild (2001–02) ||21–26–8–1 || 
|- align="center"
|57||T||February 8, 2002||3–3 OT|| align="left"| @ Nashville Predators (2001–02) ||21–26–9–1 || 
|- align="center" bgcolor="#CCFFCC"
|58||W||February 9, 2002||4–2 || align="left"| @ Tampa Bay Lightning (2001–02) ||22–26–9–1 || 
|- align="center" bgcolor="#CCFFCC"
|59||W||February 11, 2002||3–1 || align="left"|  Tampa Bay Lightning (2001–02) ||23–26–9–1 || 
|- align="center" bgcolor="#CCFFCC"
|60||W||February 26, 2002||4–3 || align="left"|  Florida Panthers (2001–02) ||24–26–9–1 || 
|- align="center" bgcolor="#FFBBBB"
|61||L||February 28, 2002||2–5 || align="left"|  San Jose Sharks (2001–02) ||24–27–9–1 || 
|-

|- align="center" bgcolor="#CCFFCC"
|62||W||March 2, 2002||3–2 OT|| align="left"| @ Ottawa Senators (2001–02) ||25–27–9–1 || 
|- align="center" bgcolor="#FFBBBB"
|63||L||March 4, 2002||2–3 || align="left"|  Toronto Maple Leafs (2001–02) ||25–28–9–1 || 
|- align="center" bgcolor="#CCFFCC"
|64||W||March 6, 2002||3–2 || align="left"|  Calgary Flames (2001–02) ||26–28–9–1 || 
|- align="center"
|65||T||March 8, 2002||2–2 OT|| align="left"| @ Carolina Hurricanes (2001–02) ||26–28–10–1 || 
|- align="center" bgcolor="#CCFFCC"
|66||W||March 10, 2002||4–2 || align="left"|  Edmonton Oilers (2001–02) ||27–28–10–1 || 
|- align="center" bgcolor="#FFBBBB"
|67||L||March 12, 2002||2–5 || align="left"|  Dallas Stars (2001–02) ||27–29–10–1 || 
|- align="center" bgcolor="#FFBBBB"
|68||L||March 15, 2002||4–5 || align="left"| @ San Jose Sharks (2001–02) ||27–30–10–1 || 
|- align="center" bgcolor="#FFBBBB"
|69||L||March 16, 2002||1–4 || align="left"| @ Edmonton Oilers (2001–02) ||27–31–10–1 || 
|- align="center" bgcolor="#CCFFCC"
|70||W||March 19, 2002||3–0 || align="left"| @ Colorado Avalanche (2001–02) ||28–31–10–1 || 
|- align="center" bgcolor="#CCFFCC"
|71||W||March 21, 2002||4–3 || align="left"| @ Toronto Maple Leafs (2001–02) ||29–31–10–1 || 
|- align="center" bgcolor="#CCFFCC"
|72||W||March 23, 2002||5–2 || align="left"| @ Columbus Blue Jackets (2001–02) ||30–31–10–1 || 
|- align="center" bgcolor="#FFBBBB"
|73||L||March 24, 2002||2–6 || align="left"| @ Pittsburgh Penguins (2001–02) ||30–32–10–1 || 
|- align="center" bgcolor="#CCFFCC"
|74||W||March 26, 2002||4–3 || align="left"| @ Buffalo Sabres (2001–02) ||31–32–10–1 || 
|- align="center" bgcolor="#CCFFCC"
|75||W||March 29, 2002||3–1 || align="left"| @ New Jersey Devils (2001–02) ||32–32–10–1 || 
|- align="center" bgcolor="#CCFFCC"
|76||W||March 30, 2002||4–2 || align="left"|  New York Islanders (2001–02) ||33–32–10–1 || 
|-

|- align="center" bgcolor="#CCFFCC"
|77||W||April 3, 2002||4–1 || align="left"|  Tampa Bay Lightning (2001–02) ||34–32–10–1 || 
|- align="center"
|78||T||April 5, 2002||0–0 OT|| align="left"|  Ottawa Senators (2001–02) ||34–32–11–1 || 
|- align="center" bgcolor="#FFBBBB"
|79||L||April 6, 2002||4–5 || align="left"| @ New York Islanders (2001–02) ||34–33–11–1 || 
|- align="center" bgcolor="#CCFFCC"
|80||W||April 9, 2002||3–1 || align="left"|  Chicago Blackhawks (2001–02) ||35–33–11–1 || 
|- align="center" bgcolor="#CCFFCC"
|81||W||April 12, 2002||3–1 || align="left"| @ Buffalo Sabres (2001–02) ||36–33–11–1 || 
|- align="center" bgcolor="#FF6F6F"
|82||OTL||April 13, 2002||3–4 OT|| align="left"|  New Jersey Devils (2001–02) ||36–33–11–2 || 
|-

|-
| Legend:

Player statistics

Scoring
 Position abbreviations: C = Center; D = Defense; G = Goaltender; LW = Left Wing; RW = Right Wing
  = Joined team via a transaction (e.g., trade, waivers, signing) during the season. Stats reflect time with the Capitals only.
  = Left team via a transaction (e.g., trade, waivers, release) during the season. Stats reflect time with the Capitals only.

Goaltending

Awards and records

Transactions
The Capitals were involved in the following transactions from June 10, 2001, the day after the deciding game of the 2001 Stanley Cup Finals, through June 13, 2002, the day of the deciding game of the 2002 Stanley Cup Finals.

Trades

Players acquired

Players lost

Signings

Draft picks
Washington's draft picks at the 2001 NHL Entry Draft held at the National Car Rental Center in Sunrise, Florida.

See also
 2001–02 NHL season

Notes

References

Wash
Wash
Washington Capitals seasons
Cap
Cap